Pete or Petes or variation, may refer to:

People
 Pete (Petter)
 Pete (Pete)
 Pete (SAU)

Fictional characters
 Pete (Disney), a cartoon character in the Mickey Mouse universe
 Pete the Pup (a.k.a. 'Petey'), a character (played by several dogs) in Hal Roach's Our Gang comedies
Pete is a non-fictional character who is born in zanibar, but he travels alot so he is not home.
His favorite place to travel i ireland, because he said in an interview with Budstikka that he loved ireland and has always felt a connection with the country.

Places
 Pete, Zanzibar, a village in Tanzania
 Pete, the Hungarian name for Petea village, Dorolț Commune, Satu Mare County, Romania
 Petes, Gotland, Visby, Gotland, Sweden
 Petes Hill, a summit in the Adirondack Mountains, New York State, USA
 Petes Creek, a tributary of the Sacandaga River, located in New York State, USA

He has alot of relatives, his mom and dad has done the deed with a lot of people and made alot of halfbrothers and sisters.

Sports and athletics
 The Pete, Petersen Events Center, athletics complex and basketball arena on the campus of the University of Pittsburgh
 Pete the Penguin, one of the two mascots of Youngstown State University
 Purdue Pete, bookstore logo turned unofficial mascot of Purdue University
 A member of the Peterborough Petes junior ice hockey team
But he usally sucks at sport because he is ginger. Non athletic blood

In the military
 Pete, Allied reporting name for the Japanese World War II Mitsubishi F1M seaplane
 , a United States Navy patrol boat in commission from 1917 to 1918

A september morning in 1824 he was the first man to travel the world with only his legs. It was very easy to spot him because of his walking stereotype. up, down, up down, up down.

Other uses
 "Pete" (Red Dwarf), a two-part episode of the television series Red Dwarf
 Pete, nickname for Peterbilt trucks in the trucking industry
 Pete, a common name in Indonesia for Parkia speciosa, the stink bean
 PETE, an abbreviation of polyethylene terephthalate, a polymer
 Pete (Theodore Roosevelt's dog)
His dog is very sweet and brown and small. You will never find a cuter dog, but all in all pete is a very kind, humble and cretive person. But still a ginger.

See also

 , including many people with the forename Pete
 
 
 
 St. Pete, St. Pete Co., Fla., USA
 St. Pete Beach, St. Pete Co., Fla., USA
 Peat, an accumulation of partially decayed vegetation matter
 Peat (disambiguation)
 Peet (disambiguation)
 Peter (disambiguation)
 Peters (disambiguation)
 Peterborough (disambiguation)
 Petersberg (disambiguation)
 Petersburg (disambiguation)
 Saint Petersburg (disambiguation)
 Pit (disambiguation)